The Nissan MS platform, M&S platform or FF-S platform is an automobile platform for front wheel drive automobiles. According to Nissan in 2000, vehicles built on this platform share floor panel and functional assemblies such as the engine, transmission and chassis components attached to it.

Models 
 Nissan Almera N16
 Nissan Bluebird Sylphy G10
 Nissan Primera P12
 Nissan Sunny/Nissan Sentra B15
 Nissan Almera Tino V10
 Nissan Wingroad/Nissan AD Van Y11
 Nissan X-Trail T30
 Renault Samsung SM3/Nissan Almera Classic
 Nissan Serena (C24)

References 

FF-S